Royal Air Force Crosby-on-Eden or more simply RAF Crosby-on-Eden was a former Royal Air Force station located  north east of Carlisle, Cumbria and  west of Brampton, Cumbria. It is nowadays Carlisle Lake District Airport.

History

Civil use
In the early 1930s, [Cumberland County Council opened Kingstown Municipal Airport, at the time outside the borough boundaries which later became the RAF Kingstown and is now Kingstown or Kingmoor Industrial estate. With the outbreak of war in 1939, RAF Kingstown's runway was too small for bombers, so the Royal Air Force developed a new airstrip at Crosby-on-Eden. The new facility came into operation in February 1941 for training operations, designating the station RAF Crosby-on-Eden.

Military use
The airfield was originally under the command of RAF Fighter Command housing No. 59 Operational Training Unit RAF (OTU) which provided day training for Hawker Hurricane pilots.

Coastal Command
The station was handed over to RAF Coastal Command, hosting No. 9 (Coastal) OTU during August 1942 for training long-range fighter crews on Bristol Beaufort and Bristol Beaufighter conversion squadrons, as well as air firing and night flying.

Transport Command
In August 1944 the station came under the command of RAF Transport Command with Douglas Dakotas of No. 109 (Transport) Operational Training Unit RAF. 109 OTU was then renamed No. 1383 (Transport) Conversion Unit RAF, on 1 August 1945 disbanding at Crosby-on-Eden on 6 August 1946.

The following units were also here at some point:
 Sub site for No. 14 Maintenance Unit RAF (April 1952)
 Detachment of No. 105 (Transport) OTU (August 1945)
 No. 2711 Squadron RAF Regiment

Post war
Crosby-on-Eden had little post war use and was closed in 1947 with the airfield returning to Carlisle City Council to continue as a municipal airport as what is now named Carlisle Lake District Airport with ownership passing to the Stobart Group.

See also
List of former Royal Air Force stations

References

Citations

Bibliography

Royal Air Force stations in Cumbria